The Bande Mataram was an Indian nationalist publication from Paris begun in September 1909 by the Paris Indian Society.  Founded by Madam Bhikaji Cama, the paper along with the later publication of Talvar was aimed at inciting nationalist unrest in India and sought to sway the loyalty of the Sepoy of the British Indian Army. It was founded in response to the British ban on Bankim Chatterjee's nationalist poem of Vande mataram, and continued the message of the journal Bande Mataram edited by Sri Aurobindo and published from Calcutta, and The Indian Sociologist that had earlier been published from London by Shyamji Krishna Varma.

References 
 Indian Unrest, by Valentine Chirol. 2000. . pp149–151
 . p49
 Hind Swaraj and Other Writings, by Anthony Parel. 1997 Cambridge University Press. . p xxviii
 Masculinity, Hinduism, and Nationalism in India, by Sikata Banerjee. 2005. SUNY Press. . p 66

1909 establishments in France
Revolutionary movement for Indian independence
Newspapers established in 1909
English-language newspapers published in India
Newspapers published in Paris
Literature of Indian independence movement
India House
Defunct newspapers published in France